André Machado Valadão (born 16 April 1978) is a Brazilian Christian singer, songwriter, worship pastor and television presenter.

Biography 
He was part of the successful band Diante do Trono, led by his sister Ana Paula Valadão, starting in 1998. Son of the senior pastor of the Lagoinha Baptist Church, Márcio Valadão, André is married to Cassiane Valadão, with whom he has two children, Lorenzo Valadão and Vitório Valadão. André is brother of singers Ana Paula Valadão and Mariana Valadão. He attended RHEMA Bible Training Center, also the DOMATA School of Missions in Tulsa/Oklahoma and the music seminar Christ For the Nations in Dallas/Texas. In his solo career, which began in 2004, he has released twelve albums, seven with songs of his own. André Valadão has received the Talent Award trophy in different categories and was also twice nominated for a Latin Grammy for album Sobrenatural (2008) and Fé (2009). His album Fé, released in 2009, was the most successful album of André Valadão.

The artist has his own trademark "Fé", used to market clothing, accessories, helmets and cosmetics. The singer has ties to the Uptime (English school) and Claro. Since 2017 the pastor leads a branch of Lagoinha Church in Orlando, Florida.

Discography 
Solo career

Video Albums

With Diante do Trono
 Diante do Trono - as member (1998)
 Exaltado - as member (2000)
 Águas Purificadoras - as member (2000)
 Aclame ao Senhor - as member (2000)
 Preciso de Ti - as member (2001)
 Brasil Diante do Trono - as member (2002)
 Nos Braços do Pai - as member (2002)
 Quero Me Apaixonar - as member (2003)
 Esperança - as member (2004)
 Ainda Existe Uma Cruz - as member (2005)
 Por Amor de Ti, Oh Brasil - as member (2006)
 In the Father's Arms - as member (2006)
 En los Brazos del Padre - as member (2006)
 Tempo de Festa - as member (2007)
 Príncipe da Paz - as member (2007)
 Com Intensidade - as member (2008)
 A Canção do Amor - as member (2008)
 Aleluia - as special participant (2010)
 Sol da Justiça - as special participant (2011)
 Glória a Deus - as special participant (2012)
 Global Project: Português - as special participant (2012)
 Tu Reinas - as special participant (2014)
 Tetelestai - as special participant (2015)
 Deus Reina - as special participant (2015)

Television program 

Fé (2012–present)

Participation in films 

Vingança (2013)

External links

References

1979 births
Living people
21st-century Brazilian male singers
21st-century Brazilian singers
Brazilian television evangelists
Christian music songwriters
Performers of contemporary worship music
Brazilian gospel singers
People from Belo Horizonte
Brazilian Baptists
Brazilian evangelicals
Brazilian male singer-songwriters